C8, C08, C.VIII or C-8 may refer to:

Transportation

Aviation 
 AEG C.VIII, a World War I German armed reconnaissance aircraft
 AGO C.VIII, a World War I German reconnaissance aircraft
 Cierva C.8, a 1926 Spanish experimental autogyro
 De Havilland Canada C-8 Buffalo, a military transport aircraft of the 1960s
 Fairchild C-8, a military transport aircraft of the 1930s
 Fokker C.VIII, a 1928 Dutch reconnaissance aircraft 

 Chicago Express Airlines (defunct) IATA code

Automotive 
 Citroën C8, a brand of minivan
 Sauber C8, a 1985 racing car
 Spyker C8, a sportscar produced by car manufacturer Spyker Cars
 Eighth generation Chevrolet Corvette (C8)

Nautical 
 HMS C8, a 1907 C-class submarine of the Royal Navy
 USS Raleigh (C-8), an 1892 protected cruiser of the United States Navy

Rail 
 LSWR C8 class, a London and South Western Railway locomotive class
 C-8 (Cercanías Madrid)
 LNER Class C8, a class of 2 4-cylinder compound locomotives

Spaceflight 
 Saturn C-8, the largest Saturn rocket to be designed

Biology, medicine and chemistry 
 Code C08 Calcium channel blockers, in ATC (Anatomical Therapeutic Chemical Classification System)
 C08, Malignant neoplasm of other and unspecified major salivary glands ICD-10 code
 C8 complex, three proteins involved in the complement system (part of the immune system)
 Cervical spinal nerve 8 in human anatomy
 Carbon-8 (C-8 or 8C), an isotope of carbon
 An octyl-type hydrocarbon with eight carbon atoms like in a C8 bonded silica stationary phase column, a type of column used in reversed-phase chromatography
 Perfluorooctanoic acid (C8; PFOA), a ubiquitous chemical used in the production of PTFE.

Arts and entertainment 
 Eighth octave C, a musical note, the highest on a piano
 Castle Infinity, the first graphical massively multiplayer online game
 C8 (French TV channel), a French TV channel
 C8 (Eastern Europe), TV channel

Other uses 
 Caldwell 8 (NGC 559), an open cluster in Cassiopeia
 Celestron,  a Schmidt-Cassegrain telescope
 C8 carbine, an assault rifle used by Canada and other NATO forces made by Diemaco/Colt Canada
 C8 Unemployment Indemnity (Shipwreck) Convention, 1920
 Elbrus-8C, a Russian 28 Nanometre 8 core microprocessor
 An international standard paper size (57×81 mm), defined in ISO 216

See also
 8C (disambiguation)